Secret Service in Darkest Africa is a 1943 Republic serial. It was Republic's thirtieth serial, of the sixty-six produced by the studio.

It was a sequel to G-Men vs. the Black Dragon released earlier in 1943, again starring Rod Cameron as American secret agent Rex Bennett. This time Bennet faces the Nazis rather than the Japanese. As with the earlier installment, Bennet is supported by characters from some of the allied nations in World War II.

The serial is also known by the titles Manhunt in the African Jungles, changed when it was re-released in 1954, and The Baron's African War, when it was edited into a 100-minute film for television in 1966.

Plot
In an attempt to control the entire Middle East and defeat the Allies, Nazi agent Baron von Rommler (Lionel Royce) captures and impersonates Sultan Abou Ben Ali (also Lionel Royce), leader of all the Arabs. Opposed to him is Secret Service Agent Rex Bennett (Rod Cameron), along with British reporter Janet Blake (Joan Marsh) and Chief of Police Captain Pierre LaSalle (Duncan Renaldo).

Cast
Rod Cameron as Rex Bennett, US agent.
Joan Marsh as Janet Blake, intrepid reporter and aviatrix
Duncan Renaldo as Captain Pierre LaSalle, head of the French police in Casablanca and code breaker
Lionel Royce as Baron von Rommler, a Nazi impersonating Arab leader Sultan Abou Ben Ali
Kurt Kreuger as Ernst Muller, Sultan Abou Ben Ali's personal secretary and Nazi agent
Frederic Brunn as Wolfe, Nazi agent
Sigurd Tor as Luger
Georges Renavent as Armand

Production
Filming on Secret Service in Darkest Africa took place between April 12 and May 27, 1943. The production budget was $174,536 but the negative cost rose to $210,033 ($35,497, or 20.3%, overbudget compared to a studio average of $8,199, or 5.7%, over all its serial production). Not only did this make the serial the most expensive of 1943 it was also the third most expensive and third most over budget of all the sixty-six serials Republic produced. The only serials that were more expensive were The Lone Ranger Rides Again (1939, $213,997) and Captain America (1944, $222,906). While Captain America was also the most overbudget (by $40,283 or 22.1%), the second most overbudget Republic serial was another 1944 serial, Haunted Harbor (by $37,757 or 22.2%).

At forty-five days, the serial's production also shares the title of the second longest shoot of all Republic serials with Jungle Girl (1941). The longest was Drums of Fu Manchu (1940) at forty-seven days. The serial's production number was 1295.

A car chase from this serial was re-used in Flying Disc Man from Mars.

Stunts
Tom Steele as Rex Bennett (doubling Rod Cameron)
John Daheim
George DeNormand
Bud Geary
Duke Green
Carey Loftin
Eddie Parker
Ken Terrell
Joe Yrigoyen

Special Effects
The special effects in this serial were produced by Republic's in-house effects duo, the Lydecker brothers.

Release

Theatrical
Secret Service in Darkest Africa'''s official release date is July 24, 1943, although this is actually the date the seventh chapter was made available to film exchanges.

The serial was re-released on April 5, 1954, under the new title Manhunt in the African Jungles, between the first runs of Trader Tom of the China Seas and Man with the Steel Whip.

TelevisionSecret Service in Darkest Africa was one of twenty-six Republic serials re-released as a film on television in 1966. The title of the film was changed to The Baron's African War. This version was cut down to 100 minutes in length.

Critical reception
Stedman compares Secret Service in Darkest Africa poorly to the first serial, G-Men vs. the Black Dragon, which was directed by William Witney. He considered Darkest Africa to be example of the decline of serials. Spencer Gordon Bennet, the director of this sequel, is blamed for this lapse, giving the serial a style similar to the Batman'' television series of the mid-1960s. Two scenes are highlighted. In the first, a duel goes into and then out of a wardrobe without stopping. In the second, the meaning of a clue is deduced with the following dialogue:

This style was toned down in future Bennet-directed serials.

In the words of Cline, both this serial and its predecessor were "well-made topical drama with highly capable and professional casts". In a departure from the normal formula, the villain's identity is known to the audience.

Chapter titles
North African Intrigue (25min 26s)
The Charred Witness (15min 35s)
Double Death (15min 33s)
The Open Grave (15min 34s)
Cloaked in Flame (15min 36s)
Dial of Doom (15min 36s)
Murder Dungeon (15min 35s)
Funeral Arrangements Completed (15min 35s)
Invisible Menace (15min 35s)
Racing Peril (15min 34s)
Lightning Terror (15min 34s)
Ceremonial Execution (15min 33s)
Fatal Leap (15min 33s)
Victim of Villainy (15min 33s)
Nazi Treachery Unmasked (15min 33s)
Source:>

This was the only 15-chapter serial produced by Republic in 1943. The other two productions were both 12-chapter serials. It had been the standard since 1938 for Republic to release two of each (which they did again for the last time in 1944).

References

External links

Secret Service in Darkest Africa article at Todd Gault's Movie Serial Experience

1943 films
1943 adventure films
1940s spy films
American black-and-white films
American World War II propaganda films
1940s English-language films
Republic Pictures film serials
American spy films
Films directed by Spencer Gordon Bennet
American adventure films
American sequel films
Films with screenplays by Joseph F. Poland